Vysoká škola is a term used for institutions of tertiary education in Slovakia and the Czech Republic. The Slovak/Czech term can be translated as “school of higher education” (literally “high school”, compare the German “Hochschule”) or, for lack of other expressions, it is also being translated into English as "college". The term can refer to all schools of higher (i.e. tertiary) education, or, in a narrower sense, only to those that are not universities.

See also 
 List of universities and colleges in Slovakia
 List of universities in the Czech Republic

Education in Slovakia
Educational organizations based in the Czech Republic
Types of university or college